Shioko Kimura is a Japanese-American biochemist specialized in endocrinology and the physiology and pathogenesis of diseases including thyroid and lung cancers. She heads the endocrinology section in the laboratory of metabolism at the National Cancer Institute.

Education 
Kimura completed a Ph.D. in chemistry at Hokkaido University. She was a postdoctoral researcher at Queen's University at Kingston and a visiting fellow at the Eunice Kennedy Shriver National Institute of Child Health and Human Development (NICHD).

Career and research 

At the National Cancer Institute (NCI), she started in the laboratory of molecular carcinogenesis. Since 1996, she heads the endocrinology section in the laboratory of metabolism.

Kimura's research focuses on understanding the role of homeodomain transcription factor NKX2-1, a marker for lung adenocarcinoma in humans, and its downstream target, a novel cytokine, SCGB3A2 in development, homeostasis, physiology, and pathogenesis of diseases, particularly cancers of the thyroid and lung. Kimura uses cell culture and mouse models, and various genetically engineered mouse lines to investigate these problems. Her studies have suggested that SCGB3A2 has anti-cancer activity, and her group is currently extensively involved in uncovering the mechanism.

Publications 

Yokoyama S, Cai Y, Murata M, Tomita T, Yoneda M, Xu L, Pilon AL, Cachau RE, Kimura S. "A novel pathway of LPS uptake through syndecan-1 leading to pyroptotic cell death". Elife. 2018 Dec 7;7:e37854. . ;  .
Iwadate M, Takizawa Y, Shirai YT, Kimura S. "An in vivo model for thyroid regeneration and folliculogenesis". Lab Invest. 2018 Sep;98(9):1126-1132. . Epub 2018 Jun 26. ; .
Kido T, Yoneda M, Cai Y, Matsubara T, Ward JM, Kimura S. "Secretoglobin superfamily protein SCGB3A2 deficiency potentiates ovalbumin-induced allergic pulmonary inflammation." Mediators Inflamm. 2014;2014:216465. . Epub 2014 Aug 27. ; .
Cai Y, Winn ME, Zehmer JK, Gillette WK, Lubkowski JT, Pilon AL, Kimura S. "Preclinical evaluation of human secretoglobin 3A2 in mouse models of lung development and fibrosis." Am J Physiol Lung Cell Mol Physiol. 2014 Jan 1;306(1):L10-22. . Epub 2013 Nov 8. ; .
Snyder, Eric L ; Watanabe, Hideo ; Magendantz, Margaret ; Hoersch, Sebastian ; Kimura, Shioko. "Nkx2-1 represses a latent gastric differentiation program in lung adenocarcinoma". Mol Cell, 2013 Apr 25;50(2):185-99. .                                    Epub 2013 Mar 21. ;

References 

Living people
Year of birth missing (living people)
Place of birth missing (living people)
Hokkaido University alumni
National Institutes of Health people
Cancer researchers
American medical researchers
Japanese medical researchers
Women medical researchers
Japanese biochemists
American women biochemists
20th-century American women scientists
21st-century American women scientists
20th-century Japanese scientists
21st-century Japanese scientists
20th-century American biologists
21st-century American biologists
21st-century American chemists
20th-century American chemists
Japanese emigrants to the United States